Jawaharlal Nehru was a 20th-century politician and statesman who served as Prime Minister of India.

Nehru may also refer to:

 Nehru family, a political family in India
 Devineni Nehru, Indian politician
 Uma Nehru, Indian independence activist
 Arun Nehru, Indian politican and columnist
 Fori Nehru, Hungarian-born Indian social worker
 Braj Kumar Nehru, Indian diplomat
 Brijlal Nehru, Indian civil servant
 Markel Ni'Jee Scott better known as Bishop Nehru, an American rapper
 Ratan Kumar Nehru, Indian civil servant
 K. N. Nehru, Indian politician
 Nehru Centre, a building in Mumbai
 Nehru Cup, international football tournament
 Jawaharlal Nehru Port, container port
 Nehru (film), a 1984 Indian English-language documentary film

See also 

 List of things named after Jawaharlal Nehru